In enzymology, a hydroxypyruvate reductase is an enzyme that catalyzes the chemical reaction

D-glycerate + NAD(P)+  hydroxypyruvate + NAD(P)H + H+

The 3 substrates of this enzyme are D-glycerate, NAD+, and NADP+, whereas its 4 products are hydroxypyruvate, NADH, NADPH, and H+.

This enzyme belongs to the family of oxidoreductases, specifically those acting on the CH-OH group of donor with NAD+ or NADP+ as acceptor. The systematic name of this enzyme class is D-glycerate:NADP+ 2-oxidoreductase. Other names in common use include beta-hydroxypyruvate reductase, NADH:hydroxypyruvate reductase, and D-glycerate dehydrogenase. This enzyme participates in glycine, serine and threonine metabolism and glyoxylate and dicarboxylate metabolism.

See also

Oxidoreductases
Enzymes
Enzyme Commission number (EC number)

References

 
 
 

EC 1.1.1
NADPH-dependent enzymes
NADH-dependent enzymes
Enzymes of known structure